Tyler Steinkamp, better known as tyler1, is an internet personality and streamer on Twitch. He is one of the most popular League of Legends online personalities with more than 5 million followers on Twitch. Steinkamp was banned from playing League of Legends from April 2016 to January 2018 for disruptive behavior towards other players, earning him the nickname of "The Most Toxic Player in North America". His first League of Legends stream after reinstatement peaked at over 382,000 viewers on Twitch, a figure that was noted as the website's largest non-tournament concurrent viewership at the time. In October 2020, he was signed by the South Korean esports team T1 as a content creator.

Career

Initial popularity and ban 
Steinkamp ranked 14th on the North American League of Legends ladder in 2014, but his stream had a modest following until 2016. Steinkamp originally became known in the League of Legends community for toxic behavior shown on his stream, which included personally attacking others and intentionally losing the game to the detriment of his teammates. This behavior eventually led to permanent bans on 22 unique accounts over several years.

Steinkamp's stream rapidly grew in popularity in April 2016, when he publicly announced that he had "reformed." His Twitch channel reportedly increased from around 5,700 followers before the announcement to over 92,000 followers by the end of the month. His improved behavior quickly lapsed but his following continued to grow, prompting several high profile and professional players to condemn his behavior. Those opposed to Steinkamp's behavior believed his popularity would encourage and normalize player toxicity, and criticized developer Riot Games for not taking action to prevent this behavior.

On April 30, 2016, Riot Games employee "Riot Socrates" announced that due to "a well-documented history of account bans for verbal abuse" and player harassment, Steinkamp would no longer be allowed to own a League of Legends account, saying "we want you to know when the rare player comes along who's a genuine jerk, we've still got your back." Under a Riot Games practice known as ID Banning, accounts Steinkamp played publicly on stream would be immediately banned, even if rules had yet to be broken on the account. To date, this type of ban has only happened a few times in League of Legends history.

After becoming banned, Steinkamp was forced to branch out from playing League of Legends, continuing to grow his fan base as his stream became more eccentric. His stream gained media attention when he acted out a 45-minute action parody of his life in front of a green screen for April Fools' Day in 2018 called "A Day in the Life of Tyler1". He also continued to stream other games, such as PlayerUnknown's Battlegrounds.

In October 2017, Riot Games employee Aaron "Sanjuro" Rutledge made insulting remarks about Steinkamp in the official r/LeagueOfLegends Subreddit's Discord server, saying he looked like a "homunculus" and that he would die "from a coke overdose or testicular cancer from all the steroids." The company responded saying "what was said is NOT okay, and we take it extremely seriously", apologizing to Steinkamp and to the League of Legends community. Steinkamp responded to the incident saying, "It really sucks that some people still hold a grudge... and refuse to acknowledge I've changed." A few days later, investigative esports journalist Richard Lewis reported that Rutledge no longer worked at Riot Games.

Return 
In late 2017, Steinkamp announced on stream that he received an email from Riot Games that his ban would be lifted at the end of the year if the accounts he played in the last month were "clean" of abusive behavior. In January 2018, Steinkamp announced that he had been unbanned, which was later confirmed with Riot Games by Kotaku. Tyler's first stream after he became unbanned in January 2018 peaked at over 382,000 viewers, breaking the record for the most concurrent viewers for an individual streamer on Twitch set by Faker in 2017. This record was broken a month later by Dr Disrespect's first stream after returning from a 2-month hiatus, although due to conflicting media reporting and technical issues with Twitch, sources disagree whether the record was actually broken.

During an angry rant about recent changes to the game, Steinkamp admitted he was addicted to League of Legends, prompting other members of the community to share their addiction stories and share advice from Riot Games employees. In October 2020, South Korean esports team T1 designated Steinkamp as a content creator.

In late 2021, Steinkamp had achieved the highest rank in 4 out of the 5 roles in League of Legends. He announced a goal to hit the highest rank in all roles in 2022, which he accomplished as of February 19th, 2022. This achievement led to him being awarded 5 "Challenger" medals by Riot Games themselves and tweets acknowledging it on their official League of Legends twitter page.

Tyler1 Championship Series 
In November 2017, Steinkamp hosted an online League of Legends tournament called the Tyler1 Championship Series (TCS). A parody of the League of Legends Championship Series (LCS), Steinkamp streamed in front of a green screen to images of LCS stadiums and a commentators' desk. The tournament peaked at over 200,000 concurrent viewers on Twitch and was viewed by professional players and LCS casters. The winning team was awarded $10,000, funded from Steinkamp directly and without any sponsors.

In November 2018, the Tyler1 Championship Series made its return, this time with an increased prize pool of $50,000, funded again by Steinkamp directly. Rift Herald particularly praised its improvement in quality compared to the previous tournament, stating "What started out as a meme... has morphed into something resembling a real online third-party tournament. There are impressive graphics, sleek and seamless replays and a parade of community talent that's been brought in to help host and cast the event."

Personal life
Steinkamp studied computer science at Central Methodist University before withdrawing to focus on his streaming career. While at Central Methodist University, he played as a running back for the university's football team.

Awards and nominations

Footnotes

See also 
 List of most-followed Twitch channels

References

External links
 
 

Living people
American esports players
League of Legends AD Carry players
Twitch (service) streamers
Central Methodist University alumni
1995 births
Internet memes
Entertainers from Missouri
People from Ralls County, Missouri
African-American media personalities
Streamer Award winners